Planos, also known as Tsilivi, is a village and a tourist resort on the island of Zakynthos, Greece. It is part of the municipal unit Arkadioi. It is situated on the northeastern coast of the island, about four kilometres northwest of the capital Zakynthos (city). The lively beach resort Tsilivi Beach is part of the community. At the north point of Tsilivi Beach, there exists an old Venetian observatory (called a vardiola).

Populated places in Zakynthos